The Tösstal railway line (Töss Valley Railway,  or TTB) is a railway in the Swiss canton of Zürich, which serves the communities of the Töss Valley. Passenger service on the line now forms part of the Zürich S-Bahn, branded as the S26, and the standard Zürcher Verkehrsverbund (ZVV) zonal fare tariffs apply to the line. It is one of the network's less-heavily traveled lines, and most of the route is single-tracked.

History 

The Tösstalbahn (TTB) opened between Winterthur Grüze and Bauma was on 4 May 1875, and its continuation to Wald opened on 15 October 1876. At Wald the line connected with the independently owned Wald-Rüti-Bahn (WR) from Rüti ZH, which had itself opened on 29 September 1876. The two lines remained in separate ownership until they both became part of the Swiss Federal Railways (SBB) on 10 June 1918, although the TTB had operated the WB from 1902.

In 1901, the Uerikon-Bauma-Bahn (UeBB) opened, providing a third access point to the Tösstal line at Bauma. This line was never a great success, and in 1948 much of it was abandoned, but the stretch from Hinwil to Bauma was acquired by the SBB, retained and electrified. However passenger services ceased by 1979, and the Hinwil to Bauma section is now operated as a preserved railway by the Dampfbahn-Verein Zürcher Oberland (DVZO).

In 1990, the passenger service on the Tösstalbahn became part of the Zürich S-Bahn network. Operation remained the responsibility of the SBB, with service provided using RBDe 560, with occasional RBe 540 supplements. Einheitswagen ("standard coaches") I or II as well as a BDt or Bt control car made up the rest of the consist, all of which were generally in the NPZ (blue over white) livery.

In December 2006, THURBO, a regional railway partly owned by the SBB, took over the operation of the S26 passenger service and provided new rolling stock. The line remains in the ownership of the SBB.

Since December 2018, the S 11 Aarau - Lenzburg - Dietikon - Zurich HB - Stettbach - Winterthur - Seuzach/Sennhof-Kyburg (- Wila) has been operating on a section of the Tösstalbahn. During rush hours, the upgrades that have taken effect enable the S-Bahn to run an hourly service to Wila. In 2019, the continuous half-hourly interval of the S26 between Winterthur and Rüti ZH has been introduced.

Operation

Route 
The line runs from a northern terminus in Winterthur Hauptbahnhof, the main station of the city of Winterthur, to a southern terminus at Rüti ZH station, on the railway line from Zürich to Rapperswil via Uster. In so doing it passes through the Zürcher Oberland following the valleys of the Töss river and Jona river.

Along its route, the line serves the following stations:
 Winterthur Hauptbahnhof
 Winterthur Grüze
 Winterthur Seen
 Sennhof-Kyburg
 Kollbrunn
 Rikon
 Rämismühle-Zell
 Turbenthal
 Wila
 Saland
 Bauma
 Steg
 Fischenthal
 Gibswil
 Wald
 Tann-Dürnten
 Rüti ZH

Services 
 

The S26 provides the only regular passenger service over the bulk of the Tösstalbahn. It provides a half-hourly service between Winterthur and Rüti. A journey along the full route takes 64 minutes.

The stations in the Winterthur suburbs are also served by other S-Bahn services, with the S12 and S35 serving Winterthur Grüze only.

Rolling stock 

Passenger service is in the hands of Stadler GTW units provided by THURBO.

References

External links 

 
  Line S26 timetable

Zürich S-Bahn lines
Transport in the canton of Zürich
Rüti, Zürich
Railway lines opened in 1875
1875 establishments in Switzerland
Defunct railway companies of Switzerland